West Livingston High School is a former Louisiana public high school which served Black residents of Livingston Parish during segregation. The school was located in the city of Denham Springs.  West Livingston High School was consolidated with Denham Springs High School following desegregation. It was one of two high schools to serve Black populations of Livingston Parish.

References

1969 disestablishments in Louisiana
Educational institutions disestablished in 1969
Defunct high schools in Louisiana
Public high schools in Louisiana
Schools in Livingston Parish, Louisiana